Gustav Almgren (6 November 1906 – 31 August 1936) was a Swedish fencer. He won a silver medal in the team épée event at the 1936 Summer Olympics.

References

External links
 

1906 births
1936 deaths
Swedish male épée fencers
Olympic fencers of Sweden
Fencers at the 1936 Summer Olympics
Olympic silver medalists for Sweden
Olympic medalists in fencing
Medalists at the 1936 Summer Olympics
20th-century Swedish people